Igor Budiša (born 23 September 1977 in Osijek) is a Croatian retired football player and current manager of Croatian third-tier side Međimurje.

Club career
During his career Budiša played for a number of clubs in Croatia, Germany, Hungary, Greece, Russia and China.

References

External links
 

1977 births
Living people
Footballers from Osijek
Association football defenders
Croatian footballers
NK Osijek players
NK Inter Zaprešić players
NK Marsonia players
SV Eintracht Trier 05 players
1. FC Saarbrücken players
1. FC Schweinfurt 05 players
Zalaegerszegi TE players
Panachaiki F.C. players
Xanthi F.C. players
FC Shinnik Yaroslavl players
Qingdao Hainiu F.C. (1990) players
Jiangsu F.C. players
HNK Šibenik players
RNK Split players
Croatian Football League players
Second Football League (Croatia) players
First Football League (Croatia) players
2. Bundesliga players
Nemzeti Bajnokság I players
Super League Greece players
Russian Premier League players
Chinese Super League players
China League One players
Croatian expatriate footballers
Expatriate footballers in Germany
Croatian expatriate sportspeople in Germany
Expatriate footballers in Hungary
Croatian expatriate sportspeople in Hungary
Expatriate footballers in Greece
Croatian expatriate sportspeople in Greece
Expatriate footballers in Russia
Croatian expatriate sportspeople in Russia
Expatriate footballers in China
Croatian expatriate sportspeople in China
Croatian football managers
NK Međimurje managers